The rufescent antshrike (Thamnistes rufescens) is a passerine bird in the antbird family.

It is a resident breeder in the tropical New World from eastern Peru to western Bolivia. It was considered a subspecies of the russet antshrike, but was split in 2018 due to vocal and plumage differences.

It is a bird of forest, old second growth, semi-open woodland and edges. The female lays two brown-speckled white eggs in a deep cup nest high in a tree, usually in a semi-open location. Nest-building, incubation, and care of the young are shared by both sexes.

The rufescent antshrike feeds on insects and other arthropods, which it gleans from foliage like a vireo. It may be seen alone, in pairs, or with tanagers and warblers in mixed-species feeding flocks.

References 

rufescent antshrike
Birds of the Peruvian Andes
Birds of the Bolivian Andes
Rufescent antshrike